Pedaliodes cledonia is a butterfly of the family Nymphalidae. It is found in Peru and Bolivia. The habitat consists of mid-elevation cloud forests.

The length of the forewings is 25–27 mm. The upperside of the wings is uniform glossy dark brown. The underside of the forewings is uniform dull medium brown, while the hindwings are medium brown with a faint ripple-like pattern, suffused with brick red and orange gradually becoming more intense towards the anal margin. There is a faint anal wedge of sparse yellow scales.

Subspecies
Pedaliodes cledonia cledonia (southern Peru, Bolivia)
Pedaliodes cledonia modesta Pyrcz, 2004 (northern Peru)

References

Satyrinae
Butterflies described in 1905